Kang Mi-soon (born 16 February 1993) is a Chinese-South Korean table tennis player. An ethnic Korean born in China, she became a naturalized South Korean in 2008.

Playing for a club in Qingdao at age 14, Kang was ranked No. 6 in China's second division, when she emigrated to South Korea. Her mother had settled in South Korea two years prior, in 2005.

References

Table tennis players from Heilongjiang
People from Daqing
1993 births
Living people
Chinese female table tennis players
South Korean female table tennis players
Chinese emigrants to South Korea
Naturalised table tennis players
Naturalized citizens of South Korea
Chinese people of Korean descent